Factory Shanghai is a stand-alone creative space located at the art deco Shanghai landmark 1933 creative complex in the Hongkou District of Shanghai, China about five minutes north of The Bund. The concept was created and produced by global digital marketing agency Profero.

意工场 Factory is made up of open inter-connected components which include creative workshops, galleries, exhibits, retail, members bar, lounge, restaurant, and website linking and engaging the world.

References

Buildings and structures in Shanghai